Xenharmonic music is music that uses a tuning system that is unlike the 12-tone equal temperament scale. It was named by Ivor Darreg, from Xenia (Greek ξενία), hospitable, and Xenos (Greek ξένος) foreign. He stated that it was "intended to include just intonation and such temperaments as the 5-, 7-, and 11-tone, along with the higher-numbered really-microtonal systems as far as one wishes to go."

John Chalmers, author of Divisions of the Tetrachord, wrote, "The converse of this definition is that music which can be performed in 12-tone equal temperament without significant loss of its identity is not truly microtonal." Thus xenharmonic music may be distinguished from twelve-tone equal temperament, as well as use of intonation and equal temperaments, by the use of unfamiliar intervals, harmonies, and timbres.

Theorists other than Chalmers consider xenharmonic and non-xenharmonic to be subjective. Edward Foote, in his program notes for 6 degrees of tonality, refers to the differences in his response to the tunings he uses, such as Kirnberger and DeMorgan, from "shocking," to "too subtle to immediately notice," saying that "[t]emperaments are new territory for 20th-century ears. The first-time listener may find it shocking to hear the harmony change 'color' during modulations or too subtle to immediately notice."

Diatonic xenharmonic music

Music also can share much of the familiar territory of twelve-tone music yet also contain xenharmonic features. For example, Easley Blackwood, author of The Structure of Recognizable Diatonic Tunings (1985), wrote many etudes in equal temperament systems ranging from 12 to 24 tones. These etudes bring out connections and resemblances to twelve-tone music as well as various xenharmonic characteristics, reflected in Twelve Microtonal Etudes for Electronic Music Media.

More radically, for his sixteen notes, Andantino writes: 

Darreg explains: "I devised the term 'xenharmonic' to refer to everything that does not sound like 12-tone equal temperament."

Tunings, instruments, and composers 

Music using scales or tuning other than 12-tone equal temperament can be classified as xenharmonic music. This includes other equal divisions of the octave and scales based on extended just intonation.

Tunings derived from the partials or overtones of physical objects with an inharmonic spectrum or overtone series such as rods, prongs, plates, discs, spheroids and rocks occasionally are the basis of xenharmonic exploration. William Colvig, who worked with the composer Lou Harrison created the tubulong, a set of xenharmonic tubes.

Electronic music composed with arbitrarily chosen xenharmonic scales was explored on the album Radionics Radio: An Album of Musical Radionic Thought Frequencies (2016) by British composer Daniel Wilson, who composed with frequency-runs submitted by users of a web application that replicated radionics-based electronic soundmaking equipment used by Oxford's De La Warr Laboratories in the late 1940s. Elaine Walker (composer) is an electronic musician who writes xenharmonic music by building new types of music keyboards. 

The Non-Pythagorean scale utilized by Robert Schneider of The Apples in Stereo, based on a sequence of logarithms, may be considered xenharmonic, as well as Annie Gosfield's purposefully "out of tune" sampler-based music using non systematic tunings and the work of other composers including Elodie Lauten, Wendy Carlos, Ivor Darreg, and Paul Erlich.

See also
 Bohlen–Pierce scale
 Regular temperament

References

Further reading
Sethares, William (2004) Tuning, Timbre, Spectrum, Scale. .

External links
Microtonality - Web 
Microtonal music on CD
Homepage for William Sethares
The Xenharmonic Wiki, formerly at Wikispaces
Xenharmonic Alliance
 Barbieri, Patrizio. Enharmonic instruments and music, 1470-1900. (2008) Latina, Il Levante Libreria Editrice
 Blackwood Microtonal Compositions Easley Blackwood & Jeffrey Kust, on iTunes Includes Fanfare in 19-EDO. Also includes the 16 notes Andantino as the first of the twelve etudes in that collection.
microtonal piano work of Noah Jordan

Microtonality